David Hinds (born 15 June 1956) is a British musician and the founding member, rhythm guitarist and lead vocalist for the reggae band Steel Pulse.

Life and career
Hinds was born in Handsworth, Birmingham, England, to parents who migrated to the UK from Jamaica in the mid-1950s, along with many other Jamaicans and other British Caribbean islanders to rebuild post-World War II Britain. At the age of five, he started elementary school and completed all his schooling by 1974. During that period, the music out of Jamaica became a major influence on Hinds' perception on life in years to come. As he explained in an interview on radio programme Afropop Worldwide, "I remember each of my elder siblings coming over with the latest form of music and dance as well as what was happening socially and politically on the island."

At Handsworth Wood Boys Secondary School, Hinds met fellow student Basil Gabbidon; together, they founded Steel Pulse in 1975.

Outside of Steel Pulse, Hinds has written songs for various films including "Can't Stand It", featured in the film Do The Right Thing, directed by Spike Lee (1989). He has also released two solo singles via the France-based Heartical label.

References

External links 
 

1956 births
Living people
English male singers
English pop guitarists
English male guitarists
English people of Jamaican descent
English Rastafarians
Musicians from Birmingham, West Midlands
British reggae musicians
Black British musicians
Converts to the Rastafari movement
People from Handsworth, West Midlands